Geoffrey Lees is the name of:

Geoffrey Lees (cricketer) (1920–2012), English cricketer
Geoff Lees (footballer) (1933–2019), English footballer
Geoff Lees (racing driver) (born 1951), English racing driver